Autochloris trinitatis is a moth of the subfamily Arctiinae. It was described by Rothschild. It is found in Trinidad.

The wingspan is 34 mm. The forewings are dark red-brown with a metallic green point at the base. The hindwings are dark red-brown.

References

Moths described in 1912
Arctiinae
Moths of the Caribbean